Tupelo Hardware Co. Inc. is a hardware store in Tupelo, Mississippi, that is credited with selling Elvis Presley's mother, Gladys, his first guitar.  The business is still located at the corner of Main Street and Front Street in downtown Tupelo and still sells guitars.

History 
 
Tupelo Hardware Company is a family business owned and managed by four generations of the Booth family. The original business was founded in 1926 by George H. Booth, and later incorporated in 1969 by the founder and his son William, who worked with his father after his return from World War II until his father's death in 1973. William and his son, George H. Booth II, worked together from 1976 until William's death in 2000. George H. Booth III joined his father in the business in 2014.

Cultural context 

Journalist Andy Gill, writing in The Independent in July 2006 referred to Tupelo Hardware as an "Aladdin's cave of DIY delight." That author ruminated on the store's old-time hardware emporium atmosphere against the cultural backdrop of the Deep South.

The shop is, according to its motto, "Known For Values". It is primarily a working hardware store, but has a dual existence as a holy site of pilgrimage for fans of Elvis and enthusiasts of the history of rock and roll.

References 
 The guitar  and 
 More photographs 
 Additional history 
 Tupelo Hardware's Official Website

Elvis Presley
Hardware stores of the United States
Companies based in Mississippi
Buildings and structures in Tupelo, Mississippi
Retail buildings in Mississippi